Algie is a family name, originating from Jacobo Algeo, from Italy in 1420. He travelled to Scotland in 1453. Many Scottish Algeos descended from him later changed the name to Algie approximately six generations later, while others later changed their surname once again to Elgee.  Some Elgees migrated to Ireland, while others eventually migrated to the United States and Canada from Scotland and Ireland.

People

Surname
 Mathhew Algie (1810-1902), Scottish tea and coffee trader, founder of Matthew Algie
 Ronald Algie (1888–1978), New Zealand lawyer and politician
 Roy Algie (1889-1946), Australian rugby league footballer
 Wallace Lloyd Algie (1891–1918), Canadian Victoria Cross recipient

First name
 Algie Eggertsen Ballif (1896–1984), educational leader and politician in Utah
 Algie Howell (born 1938), American politician
 Algie Martin Simons (1870–1950), American socialist journalist, newspaper editor and political activist

Nickname
 Algernon Gissing (1860-1937), English writer and novelist
 Algernon Algie McBride (1869–1956), American baseball player
 Algernon Algie Rainbow (1885–1969), New Zealand accountant, company director and local politician
 Algernon Stanley Smith (1890-1978), British Protestant Christian missionary in Uganda and Ruanda

Fictional characters
 the title character of Algie the Miner, a 1912 film
 the protagonist of Algie's Romance, a 1918 Australian film

References

External links
 Genealogy forum for the family name

Hypocorisms